Dark Star is the name of a cave system located in the Boysuntov Range in  Uzbekistan, some  from the capital Tashkent, near the village of Boysun.

It has seven entrances. The first cave entrances were discovered by Russians in 1984, but it was not until 1990 when British cavers began to explore it. It is named after the 1974 film of the same name.

Nearby is another cave system, Festivalnaya; it is suspected the two are connected.

References 

Caves of Uzbekistan
Geography of Uzbekistan